Irish Buffalo Creek is a  long 4th order tributary to the Rocky River in Cabarrus County, North Carolina.  This is the only stream of this name in the United States.

Variant names
According to the Geographic Names Information System, it has also been known historically as:
Buffalo Creek

Course
Irish Buffalo Creek rises about 1.5 miles west of Five Points, North Carolina, and then flows south and southeast to join the Rocky River about 3 miles northeast of Flows Store.

Watershed
Irish Buffalo Creek drains  of area, receives about 46.9 in/year of precipitation, has a wetness index of 404.66, and is about 33% forested.

References

Rivers of North Carolina
Rivers of Cabarrus County, North Carolina
Rivers of Rowan County, North Carolina